Manuel Gomes (born 12 August 1966) is an Angolan boxer. He competed in the men's bantamweight event at the 1988 Summer Olympics.

References

External links
 

1966 births
Living people
Angolan male boxers
Olympic boxers of Angola
Boxers at the 1988 Summer Olympics
People from Cuanza Sul Province
Bantamweight boxers